Linda Gustafsson (born 20 February 1974) is a Swedish ice hockey player. She competed in the women's tournament at the 1998 Winter Olympics.

References

External links
 

1974 births
Living people
Swedish women's ice hockey players
Olympic ice hockey players of Sweden
Ice hockey players at the 1998 Winter Olympics
Sportspeople from Umeå